The 44th edition of the Vuelta a Colombia was held from March 15 to March 27, 1994. There were a total number of 95 competitors.

Stages

1994-03-15: Ocaña — Ocaña (7.9 km)

1994-03-16: Aguachica — Bucaramanga (173.1 km)

1994-03-17: Floridablanca — Socorro (116.5 km)

1994-03-18: Socorro — Tunja (164.4 km)

1994-03-19: Tunja — La Vega (192.3 km)

1994-03-20: Honda — Manizales (141.8 km)

1994-03-21: Manizales — Alto de Santa Helena (213.8 km)

1994-03-22: Caldas — Pereira (191.9 km)

1994-03-23: Pereira — Armenia (47.5 km)

1994-03-24: Armenia — Ibagué (140 km)

1994-03-25: Ibagué — Neiva (210 km)

1994-03-26: Neiva — Girardot (175.4 km)

1994-03-27: Girardot — Alto de Patios (152.6 km)

Final classification

Teams 

Lotería de Medellín-AA

Cerveza Aguila-Kelme

Gaseosas Glacial PRF

Manzana Postobón PRF

Quintanilha (PRF)-Lotería de Boyacá

Pilsener Ecuador

Pony Malta de Bavaria-Avianca

Agua Natural Glacial

Ron Medellín-Lotería de Medellín

Manzana Postobón Aficionado

Cicloases (7)

References 
 pedalesybielas (Archived 2009-10-21)

Vuelta a Colombia
Colombia
Vuelta Colombia
March 1994 sports events in South America